Kirtidan Gadhvi is an Indian singer from Gujarat.

Early life 
Gadhvi was born and raised in Valvod, kheda district,known as Madhya Gujarat. Kirtidan received his BPA and a MPA in music from the Faculty of Performing Arts, M. S. University, Vadodara under B. I. Mahant and Rajesh Kelkar.

Career 
He debuted at a cow protection rally in Jamnagar, Gujarat, in 2015 that raised Rs 45 million. He sang the song "Laadki" on the TV show MTV Coke Studio along with Sachin–Jigar, Tanishka, and Rekha Bhardwaj in April 2015.

He is known for the dayras, folk songs and classical nuances.

He moved to Bhavnagar and became a music teacher at the Bhavnagar University. "Laadki", "Nagar Me Jogi Aaya" and "Gori Radha Ne Kaalo Kaan" are among his popular songs.Currently he is living in Rajkot for his travelling convenience of his musical events in Kutch district, Kathiawar.

He was awarded "World Amazing Talent" Award in US and became the brand ambassador of World Talent Organization, USA.

References

External links
 Official website

Gujarati people
People from Gujarat
Maharaja Sayajirao University of Baroda alumni
Singers from Gujarat
1976 births
Living people
Gujarati playback singers
Charan
Gadhavi (surname)